Orazio Bianchi was an Italian painter of the Baroque period. He was born in Rome. He painted Marriage of St. Joseph and the Virgin Mary for the church of San Gioseffo in Rome.

References

Painters from Rome
17th-century Italian painters
Italian male painters
Italian Baroque painters
Year of death unknown
Year of birth unknown